Nemanovci is a small suburban settlement (hamlet) near Novi Sad, Serbia. It is located on the outskirts of Novi Sad proper area, close to Čenej and Kać.

Nemanovci is not regarded as a separate populated place in census, but as part of village of Čenej, some 10 km away. However, Nemanovci, together with neighbouring Pejićevi Salaši, have their own local community named Pejićevi Salaši–Nemanovci.

By a January 2014 estimation, the local community numbered 311 inhabitants in 64 homes.

References

Suburbs of Novi Sad